Fairfield is a census-designated place (CDP) and unincorporated community in Hyde County, North Carolina, United States. As of the 2010 census it had a population of 258. The Fairfield Historic District was listed on the National Register of Historic Places in 1985.

Geography
Fairfield is in northern Hyde County, on the northern side of Lake Mattamuskeet. North Carolina Highway 94 passes through the community, leading north  to U.S. Route 64 in Columbia and south across the lake  to U.S. Route 264.

Demographics

2020 census

As of the 2020 United States census, there were 231 people, 102 households, and 82 families residing in the CDP.

Education
The local school is Mattamuskeet School of Hyde County Schools.

References

Census-designated places in Hyde County, North Carolina
Census-designated places in North Carolina